Eva Grožajová, married Bergerová-Grožajová, (died 2017) was a competitive figure skater who represented Czechoslovakia. She was the 1962 Blue Swords champion and 1960 Winter Universiade silver medalist. She placed 7th at the 1961 European Championships and 13th at the 1962 World Championships. She was coached by Hilda Múdra.

Competitive highlights

References

Czechoslovak female single skaters
Universiade medalists in figure skating
2017 deaths
Universiade silver medalists for Czechoslovakia
Competitors at the 1960 Winter Universiade